Sarkis Assadourian  (born 22 May 1948) is an Iranian fencer of Armenian descent. He competed in the individual and team épée and team foil events at the 1976 Summer Olympics.

References

External links
 
 Bio

1948 births
Living people
Iranian male épée fencers
Olympic fencers of Iran
Iranian people of Armenian descent
Ethnic Armenian sportspeople
Fencers at the 1976 Summer Olympics
Asian Games gold medalists for Iran
Asian Games bronze medalists for Iran
Asian Games medalists in fencing
Fencers at the 1974 Asian Games
Medalists at the 1974 Asian Games
Iranian male foil fencers
Iranian male sabre fencers
21st-century Iranian people
20th-century Iranian people